Events from the year 1739 in France.

Incumbents 
Monarch: Louis XV

Events

Births
 

 25 January – Charles François Dumouriez, French general (d. 1823)
 15 February – Alexandre-Théodore Brongniart, French architect (d. 1813)
 19 March – Charles-François Lebrun, duc de Plaisance, Third Consul of France (d. 1824)
 20 November – Jean-François de La Harpe, French critic (d. 1803) 
 14 December – Pierre Samuel du Pont de Nemours, French politician (d. 1817)
 Bénédict Chastanier, French surgeon (d. 1816)

Deaths
 15 January – Eléonor Marie du Maine, French Nobleman. 
 11 August  – François de La Rochefoucauld, Marquis de Montandre

See also

References

1730s in France